Ahmed Hassan Barata is a Nigerian politician who was elected to the Nigerian Senate for the Adamawa South Senatorial seat in Adamawa State, Nigeria in the April 2011 federal elections. He ran for election on the People's Democratic Party (PDP) platform.

Barata was elected to the House of Representatives for the Guyuk/Shelleng constituency in May 1999; he served until May 2003.He contest for reelection for that constituency in April 2007 but was defeated by James Audu Kwawo of the Action Congress.

Barata won the PDP nomination for the 2011 Adamawa South Senatorial race in a primary election. He received 738 votes, defeating the incumbent Senator Grace Folasade Bent, who had received 406.
Bent, who was said to have been favored by the PDP party leadership, later claimed that she had won a rerun primary.
While her assertion was being reviewed, a judge ordered the Independent National Electoral Commission (INEC) to remove Barata's name from the list of candidates and replace it with Bent.
Bent's claim was later rejected by the INEC, by the Federal High Court, Abuja and by the PDP's counsel.
 
In the 9 April 2011 elections, Barata won with 101,760 votes, ahead of Mohammed Koiraga Jada of the Action Congress of Nigeria (ACN) with 66,525 votes.

References

Living people
People from Adamawa State
Peoples Democratic Party members of the Senate (Nigeria)
Year of birth missing (living people)